Pasha Namazovych Kasanov (born 19 January 1953) is a retired Soviet football player and Ukrainian coach.

External links 
Profile on website 

1953 births
Living people
Sportspeople from Primorsky Krai
Soviet footballers
FC Metalurh Zaporizhzhia players
FC Polissya Zhytomyr players
Ukrainian football managers
Ukrainian Premier League managers
Association football midfielders